is a subway station on the Tokyo Metro Ginza Line, in Taitō, Tokyo, Japan, operated by the Tokyo subway operator Tokyo Metro. It is numbered "G-15".

Lines
It also provides connections to Ueno-Okachimachi Station on the Toei Ōedo Line, Okachimachi Station on the Yamanote Line, and Naka-Okachimachi Station on the Tokyo Metro Hibiya Line.

Station layout
The station has two side platforms located on the first basement (B1F) level, serving two tracks.

Platforms

History
Ueno-hirokoji Station opened on 1 January 1930.

The station facilities were inherited by Tokyo Metro after the privatization of the Teito Rapid Transit Authority (TRTA) in 2004.

Passenger statistics
In fiscal 2011, the station was used by an average of 21,631 passengers daily.

References

External links

 Tokyo Metro station information

Stations of Tokyo Metro
Tokyo Metro Ginza Line
Railway stations in Tokyo
Railway stations in Japan opened in 1930